Büsingen am Hochrhein ("Büsingen on the Upper Rhine"; Alemannic: Büesinge am Hochrhi, often known simply as Büsingen, is a German municipality in the south of Baden-Württemberg and an enclave entirely surrounded by the Swiss cantons of Schaffhausen, Zürich and Thurgau. It has a population of about 1,450 inhabitants. The distance to this enclave is approximately 5 km (3.1 mi) from the town of Schaffhausen and 3 km (1.8 mi) from Dörflingen, the nearest village.

Politically Büsingen is part of Germany, forming part of the district of Konstanz, but economically it forms part of the Swiss customs union, along with the principality of Liechtenstein and up until 2019, albeit unofficially, the Italian village of Campione d'Italia. As such there have been no border controls between Switzerland and Büsingen since 4 October 1967.

Büsingen is a holiday destination for much of the year and attracts a significant number of visitors from around the region as well as from further afield, for its recreational areas along the Rhine and proximity to the Rheinfall waterfalls in nearby Neuhausen am Rheinfall. Many dwellings in Büsingen are holiday flats that are accompanied by a number of small guest houses.

History
The municipality was long under Austrian control (Vorderösterreich), although Austrian sovereignty did not go unchallenged by the Confederate Swiss of neighbouring Schaffhausen. An incident in 1693 in which Austrian feudal lord Eberhard Im Thurn was abducted and incarcerated by Swiss authorities, and the subsequent diplomatic dispute, played a particular role in the village being kept away from Swiss control.
 
The village became part of the German kingdom of Württemberg under the 1805 Peace of Pressburg agreement during the Napoleonic Wars.

In 1918, after the First World War, a referendum was held in Büsingen in which 96% of voters voted to become part of Switzerland. However no land transfer took place as Switzerland could not offer anything suitable in exchange. Later attempts to transfer the village to Swiss sovereignty were unsuccessful and consequently Büsingen has remained an exclave of Germany ever since.

During the Second World War, Switzerland effectively shut down the border, leaving Büsingen cut off from the rest of the Third Reich. German soldiers on home leave were required to deposit their weapons at the border guards' posts in Gailingen am Hochrhein. The Swiss customs officers would then supply them with greatcoats to cover up their German uniforms for the duration of their short journey through Dörflingen (Swiss territory) to their homes in Büsingen.

By the time of Yalta Conference in early 1945, a complete German defeat was inevitable. The inter-zonal borders of Allied-occupied Germany were finalized at this conference, with Büsingen assigned to the French zone. Once again, the Swiss government refused to consider annexing the town on the grounds that any transfer of territory could only be negotiated with a sovereign German government, which ceased to exist following the German surrender. From the Swiss perspective, any unilateral annexation of the territory of her defeated neighbour (no matter how small) would have been viewed both within and outside Switzerland as a tacit recognition of the victors' right to also adjust Germany's postwar borders. The country's large German-speaking majority, although generally hostile to Nazism, was deeply offended by the wholesale annexation of Germany's eastern territories and the expulsion of Germans from these lands, so it would have been politically unacceptable for the Swiss government to act in any sort of similar manner with respect to Büsingen.

Nevertheless, the Swiss shared Allied concerns that the exclave might become a haven for Nazi war criminals; thus, an agreement was quickly reached to allow limited numbers of French soldiers to cross Switzerland for the purpose of maintaining law and order in Büsingen. Following the formation of the Federal Republic, Büsingen eventually became part of the new state of Baden-Württemberg.

On 9 September 1957, a conference between Switzerland and what was then West Germany was held in Locarno, with the aim of regulating the jurisdictions of both countries in Büsingen.

Büsingen's official name was altered from Büsingen (Oberrhein) to Büsingen am Hochrhein on 6 December 1961.

A treaty signed much later (on 23 November 1964) came into effect on 4 October 1967. The exclave of Büsingen was formally defined in this treaty. At the same time, the West German exclave of Verenahof, consisting of just three houses and eleven West German citizens, became part of Switzerland, whilst Büsingen's de facto customs union with Switzerland, begun in 1947, was made official.

Geography

One named stone, the Hattinger Stone, marks the Büsingen-Dörflingen boundary. Along with several other border points, it is situated in the river Rhine.

Büsingen is situated close to the city of Schaffhausen. In the outlying hamlet of Stemmer the border between German and Swiss territory runs down the middle of a road. Houses on one side of the road are in Switzerland, houses on the other side are in Germany.

Büsingen is not part of the customs territory of the European Union but belongs to Swiss customs territory. Although Büsingen is otherwise a German village, EU economic regulations (other than those covered by SwissEU treaties) do not apply there.

Within the territory of Büsingen am Hochrhein are the sites of two abandoned villages Eggingen and Gluringen.

Peculiarities of Büsingen am Hochrhein

Currency
Büsingen is the only German village in which people pay mostly with Swiss francs, although technically the euro is legal tender as throughout Germany. Until the late 1980s, the Deutsche Mark was not accepted in Büsingen. Even the Büsingen post office accepted only Swiss francs for payment of German stamps. Despite the Deutsche Mark and later the euro being accepted, today Swiss francs are still more popular, since most residents in employment are cross-border commuters working in Switzerland and as such are paid in Swiss francs.

Electricity
Electricity is provided by Switzerland and as such is billed in Swiss francs with there being no choice of supplier. Wall sockets are generally standard German Schuko sockets, as in the rest of Germany, though some owners may have opted to install Swiss sockets in their properties.

Health insurance
Residents of Büsingen am Hochrhein can opt to take out a health insurance policy either in Switzerland or in Germany (coverage is mandatory for residents of both countries).

Law and policing
The treaty between the two countries defines which areas of law are governed by Swiss legislation and which ones come under German legislation. Since there are no border checks between Büsingen and Switzerland, the cantonal police of Schaffhausen are permitted to arrest people in Büsingen and bring them into Switzerland. The number of Swiss police officers is limited to ten at any one time and the number of German police officers to three per 100 inhabitants, which means roughly forty-five, given the current population of around 1,540. German police officers travelling to Büsingen however must use designated routes and refrain from all official acts while crossing Swiss territory.

Postal services
There is a German post office in Büsingen that also provides Swiss postal services at Swiss inland rates. Büsingen has two postal codes, one German, D-78266, formerly D-7701, and one Swiss, CH-8238. Letters from Büsingen may be franked with a Swiss or a German stamp. A standard letter from Büsingen to Switzerland needs either an 85 Rappen Swiss stamp or a 80 euro cent German one.

Deutsche Post is responsible for delivering of post (letters and almost all parcels) in Büsingen, though some services are provided by Swiss Post. Other letter and parcel delivery services that operate in Germany such as Hermes do not deliver to Büsingen as they are not authorized to cross into the Swiss customs area to be able to reach the German exclave.

Goods sent from outside of the European customs area may pass through two separate customs checks: the first upon entering Germany proper, the second upon entering Büsingen itself. This can however be avoided by addressing mail shipped to Büsingen as if it were part of Switzerland, using the Swiss postal code. Goods entering Büsingen must comply with Swiss customs rules and are subject to Swiss customs duties and taxes.

Telecommunications
Residents of Büsingen can be reached by telephone using either a German number (with the prefix +49) or a Swiss one (with the prefix +41) or both, depending on which telephone or internet service provider(s) the resident has opted to have a contract with. Dwellings generally have both countries' phone sockets.

School
Büsingen has a kindergarten, the current building of which opened in 1987. By 1988, however, it was overcrowded, so the building was extended. Children attend primary school in Büsingen, and subsequently their parents may choose either a Swiss school or a German school for their secondary education.

Sports

The local association football team, FC Büsingen, is the only German team to play in the Swiss Football League.

Taxation
The much lower (compared to standard German VAT at 19%) Swiss VAT is applied to purchases made in Büsingen. It is levied at a rate of 7.7% on most commercial exchanges of goods and services. Certain exchanges, including those of basic or essential foodstuffs, drugs, books and newspapers, are subject to a reduced VAT of 2.5%. A special reduced rate of 3.7% is in use in the hotel industry.

Büsingen residents, regardless of nationality, are treated as third-country nationals with regards to VAT payable in the rest of Germany and the EU. As such residents who export purchases made in the EU to Büsingen are able to claim back the VAT paid on said purchases subsequent to exporting. Nevertheless, imports into Büsingen (via Switzerland) where applicable, are subject to Swiss importing limits, duty and VAT.

Despite further income tax breaks specific to Büsingen, younger Büsingers who work (in Switzerland or Germany) pay approximately double the amount of income tax compared to their colleagues who reside in neighbouring Swiss towns and villages, causing many young people to move away from Büsingen into Switzerland and thus the village's population to decrease notably in recent years. Büsingen has the highest average age of residents in the whole of Baden-Württemberg.

Most Büsingen residents are pensioners; many are from Switzerland, for as in the rest of Germany they pay little or no tax on their pensions. This advantage is however progressively being phased out and by 2040 will no longer exist.

Büsingen is one of just a handful of municipalities in Germany not to levy any property tax. The business tax levied in Büsingen is the lowest in Baden-Württemberg.

Payable Skype services have been unavailable in Büsingen since 1 January 2015 due to a change in VAT laws.

Time zone
In the time zone database, there is a special area Europe/Büsingen that had a different time compared to the rest of West Germany in 1980 when West Germany, but not Switzerland, observed daylight saving time.

Transport
Büsingen is served by PostBus Switzerland with a regular connection to the German village Randegg, the Swiss villages Ramsen, Buch and Dörflingen, as well as the city and railway station of Schaffhausen.

Südbadenbus from Germany also serves the village with a twice daily bus connection to Gailingen am Hochrhein. The bus passes through Swiss territory to reach the main village of Büsingen and the outlying settlement Stemmer.

Vehicle registration

Büsingen has its own licence plate (BÜS), even though it is part of Constance district, which has the KN sign. These special licence plates were created to simplify the job of Swiss customs officers. Vehicles with BÜS licence plates are treated as if they were Swiss vehicles for customs purposes.

BÜS is one of the rarest licence plates in use in Germany as there are only around 700 in use at any one time. The letters BÜS are almost always followed by an A with the occasional exception for provisionally admitted vehicles or those purchased in Switzerland, which have the letter Z.

See also

Tägermoos
Expansion of Switzerland
Campione d'Italia
Jungholz
Llívia
Verenahof

References

External links

 Büsingen official website 
 Büsingen official website  (Archived)
 Jan S. Krogh's GeoSite on Büsingen

Geography of the canton of Schaffhausen
Special territories of the European Union
Towns in Baden-Württemberg
Konstanz (district)
Germany–Switzerland border crossings
Enclaves and exclaves